Carabus allegroi is a species of ground beetle in the Carabinae subfamily that is endemic to Gansu, China.

References

allegroi
Beetles described in 2007
Beetles of Asia
Endemic fauna of Gansu